Hylemya vagans is a species of fly in the family Anthomyiidae. It is found in the Palearctic . For identification see:

References

External links
Images representing Hylemya vagans at BOLD

Anthomyiidae
Insects described in 1798
Muscomorph flies of Europe